Thumma Bala is an India prelate who served as the archbishop of Hyderabad and chairman of Andhra Pradesh Bishops' council and also the chairman of Communication Commission of the diocese from 5 May 2011 to 19 November 2020.

Early life 
He was born in Narmetta, Andhra Pradesh on 24 April 1944.

Priesthood 
He was Ordained a Catholic Priest on 21 December 1970.

Episcopate 
He was appointed Bishop of Warangal on 17 Nov 1986 by Pope John Paul II. He was Ordained Bishop on 12 March 1987. He was appointed Archbishop of Hyderabad on 12 March 2011 by Pope Benedict XVI and installed as Archbishop of Hyderabad on 5 May 2011. He was attacked by some mob in 2016.

References

1944 births
Living people
21st-century Roman Catholic archbishops in India
Christian clergy from Andhra Pradesh
People from Andhra Pradesh